Blękwit  is a village in the administrative district of Gmina Złotów, within Złotów County, Greater Poland Voivodeship, in west-central Poland.

The village has a population of 220.

Notable residents
 Herbert Pankau (born October 4, 1941), German footballer

References

Villages in Złotów County